This is a list of National Historic Sites in the province of Ontario.  As of July 2021, there were 274 sites designated in Ontario, 39 of which are administered by Parks Canada (identified below and on the cluster pages listed below by the beaver icon .  Of all provinces and territories, Ontario has the greatest number of National Historic Sites, and the largest number under Parks Canada administration, with a dense concentration in southern Ontario.  The five largest clusters are listed separately:
· List of National Historic Sites in Hamilton
· List of National Historic Sites in Kingston
· List of National Historic Sites in Niagara Region
· List of National Historic Sites in Ottawa
· List of National Historic Sites in Toronto

Numerous National Historic Events also occurred across Ontario, and are identified at places associated with them, using the same style of federal plaque which marks National Historic Sites. Several National Historic Persons are commemorated throughout the province in the same way. The markers do not indicate which designation—a Site, Event, or Person—a subject has been given. The Rideau Canal is a Site, for example, while the Welland Canal is an Event. The cairn and plaque to John Macdonell does not refer to a National Historic Person, but is erected because his home, Glengarry House, is a National Historic Site. Similarly, the plaque to John Guy officially marks not a Person, but an Event—the Landing of John Guy.

This list uses names designated by the national Historic Sites and Monuments Board, which may differ from other names for these sites.

National Historic Sites

See also

History of Ontario
 List of historic places in Ontario
Ontario Heritage Act, legislation under which heritage sites of provincial or municipal significance are designated

References

 
Ontario
National Historic Sites of Canada